Big Brother 2002, also known as Big Brother 2, was the second season of the Australian reality television series Big Brother. The season started on 8 April 2002, and ended on 1 July 2002, lasting 86 days. Big Brother 2002 was similar to the first season Big Brother 2001, and was the only one to use the same house from a previous season, albeit with some small modifications. Simultaneous with the main house was a house of six potential Intruders. A number of television specials allowed viewers to get to know the intruders and viewers were able to vote which three eventually went into the house.

A close relationship formed between Nathan Martin and Jess Hardy (Marty and Jess) who later got married after leaving the show. Their wedding plans and the ceremony were showcased in television special Marty & Jess: An Outback Wedding. The couple divorced in 2006. The Australian rock band Killing Heidi entered the house for a special surprise birthday party for Jess. During an Eviction, a 25-year-old male ran naked onto the stage and was subsequently fined $100 in court. The reserved Peter Corbett won the $250,000 first prize, with Marty coming second.

Housemates

Nominations Table
The first housemate in each box was nominated for two points, and the second housemate was nominated for one point.

Notes

 Australia voted Brodie, Keiran, and Nicole into the House as Intruders on Day 30 - They were nominated for a house vote eviction on Day 38, with Housemates voting for the 2 intruders they wish to stay.
 Brodie and Keiran were immune from this week's nominations.

Special shows

Intruders
Aired the same night as the launch show, the Intruders special revealed the six possible intruders: Hayley, Kieran, Brodie, Nicki, Nicole and Will. Gretel explained that the public will decide which intruders will enter the Big Brother house. Psychologist Carmel Hill provided insight into the personalities of the intruders.

The Honeymoon's Over
One week after the launch, Gretel presents a program in anticipation of the first round of nominations the following night. Packages are shown exploring the impact of different platonic and romantic relationships in the House, with added comments from Daily Show supervising producer Chris Blackburn. First season winner Ben Williams and psychologist Carmel Hill analyze potential nomination strategies.

Intruders: You Decide
After nearly four weeks living in the secret intruder house, it is time for the public to vote on which three intruders will enter the main Big Brother house. Viewers are shown the secret intruder house for the first time and how the intruders are adjusting to life together, and also to no communication from the outside world.

Intruders Unleashed
Gretel hosts a live special in which the results of the intruder vote are revealed and the intruders are released into the house. Psychologist Carmel Hill is on hand to analyse the impact of arrivals. Also, one housemate asks for permission to leave the house.

Housemates' Revenge
Gretel hosts a live special in which the original Housemates must vote to evict one of the three Intruders. Each Housemate is given one minute to make a case for the Intruder(s) they want to keep, then each Intruder is given an opportunity to state their case, before the Housemates cast their votes.

Mastercard $100,000 Charity Challenge

The Final Countdown

The Final Sunday Eviction

References

External Links
Big Brother 2002 website archived by Wayback Machine

2002 Australian television seasons
02